Brandon Thomas (born February 18, 1991) is a former American football offensive guard and current offensive graduate assistant for the Clemson Tigers. He was drafted by the San Francisco 49ers in the third round of the 2014 NFL Draft. He played college football at Clemson.

High school career
Thomas attended Paul M. Dorman High School in Roebuck, South Carolina.

As a four-star recruit by the Rivals.com rating service, he was rated as the 14th best offensive tackle prospect in his class.

College career
Thomas attended Clemson University from 2009 to 2013. He saw a lot of playing time at both guard and tackle during his career, and became the starting left tackle for the Tigers in 2012, where he started 26 games over his last two seasons. He was named a first-team All-ACC as a junior, and was a second-team All-ACC selection as a senior.

Professional career
On December 16, 2013, it was announced that Thomas had accepted his invitation to play in the 2014 Senior Bowl. On January 25, 2014, he played in the Reese's Senior Bowl, asapart of Atlanta Falcons' head coach Mike Smith's North team that lost 20-10 to the South. Thomas was one of 50 collegiate offensive linemen to attend the NFL Scouting Combine in Indianapolis, Indiana. He performed all of the combine drills and ran the ninth fastest 40-yard dash among all offensive linemen and had the fifth best vertical jump. On March 6, 2014, Thomas attended Clemson's pro day, along with Tajh Boyd, Martavis Bryant, Sammy Watkins, Tyler Shatley, Chandler Catanzaro, Bashaud Breeland,  and eight others. He opted to perform positional drills and bested his combine numbers in the broad jump (8'3"), short shuttle (4.75s), and three-cone drill (7.83s). On April 3, 2014, Thomas suffered a torn ACL while performing a non-contact drill at a private workout he was attending with the New Orleans Saints. At the conclusion of the pre-draft process, Thomas was projected by NFL draft experts and scouts to be a third to fifth round pick. He was ranked the tenth best offensive guard prospect in the draft by NFLDraftScout.com.

San Francisco 49ers
The San Francisco 49ers selected Thomas in the third round (100th overall) of the 2014 NFL Draft. He was the eighth offensive guard and 22nd offensive linemen selected in 2014.

2014
On May 31, 2014, 49ers signed Thomas to a four-year, $2.72 million contract that includes a signing bonus of $506,016.

Thomas spent the entire 2014 season on the reserve/non-football injury list due to the ACL injury suffered before the draft.

2015
Throughout training camp, Thomas competed against Ian Silberman, Joe Looney, Andrew Tiller, and Jordan Devey for the job as the starting left guard, left vacant by the departure of Mike Iupati to the Arizona Cardinals in free agency. Head coach Jim Tomsula named him the backup right guard to Devey to start the regular season. He was inactive for all 16 games in 2015.

Detroit Lions
On August 29, 2016, the 49ers traded Thomas to the Detroit Lions in exchange for wide receiver Jeremy Kerley.

On September 3, 2016, he was waived by the Lions and was signed to the practice squad the next day. He signed a reserve/future contract with the Lions on January 9, 2017.

On September 3, 2017, Thomas was waived by the Lions. He was signed to the practice squad on October 3, 2017. He was released on October 14, 2017.

Jacksonville Jaguars
On October 23, 2017, Thomas was signed to the Jacksonville Jaguars' practice squad. He was released on November 23, 2017, but was re-signed four days later. He signed a reserve/future contract with the Jaguars on January 22, 2018.

On July 31, 2018, Thomas was waived/injured by the Jaguars and was placed on injured reserve. He was released on August 4, 2018. He was re-signed to the practice squad on October 16, 2018. He was promoted to the active roster on December 22, 2018.

On December 10, 2019, Thomas was placed on injured reserve.

Coaching career
In 2022, Thomas began his coaching career when he joined the staff at his alma mater, Clemson, as an offensive graduate assistant.

Personal life

References

External links
Jacksonville Jaguars bio
Detroit Lions bio
Clemson Tigers bio

1991 births
Living people
American football offensive guards
American football offensive tackles
Clemson Tigers football players
Detroit Lions players
Jacksonville Jaguars players
Players of American football from South Carolina
San Francisco 49ers players
Sportspeople from Spartanburg, South Carolina